The Dennis Rapier is a purpose-built fire engine produced by Dennis Specialist Vehicles of Guildford, Surrey, England from 1991 to the early 2000s.

Features
 
Regular production of the Rapier began in 1991, following a demonstrator unit being shown around different fire brigades a year earlier. The first Rapiers maintained some design elements of the RS/SS series they replaced, although featuring a redesigned front grille and rectangular headlights.

The Rapier would receive a facelift in 1993, designed by Capoco Design.
The facelift would be mainly focused on the cab, giving it a modern and streamlined appearance and also allowing the cab to tilt to a total of 42 degrees. This facelift redesign would see Dennis and Capoco win a British Design Award in 1994.

As standard, the Rapier is powered by a Cummins C260-21 turbocharged six-cylinder engine and has an Allison MCDR five-speed automatic transmission.

While the Rapier proved very popular with some brigades, others found it to be prohibitively expensive and limited in its equipment load capacity. The Dennis Sabre would be launched in 1995 as a low-cost alternative with increased load capacity, which would ultimately succeed the Rapier and eventually be the last full-size fire engine produced by Dennis Specialist Vehicles. Production of the Dennis Rapier would eventually cease in the early 2000s due to low sales and a parts shortage as a result of the discontinuation of the Renault Midliner, which sourced the Rapier's front suspension and brakes.

Operators
Humberside Fire and Rescue Service were among the major customers of the Dennis Rapier, ordering 32 from 1993 to 2001, of which four were the pre-facelift model. Other fire brigade operators include Merseyside, who took on a handful of pre-facelift examples, West Sussex, Kent, Shropshire and Nottinghamshire.

Rapiers were also built for fire brigades in Belgium, the Netherlands and the Czech Republic.

Two Rapiers were delivered to Frankfurt and Erfurt, Germany in 2000 to evaluate whether the Rapier could function as a standard rescue pumper. The Rapier was met with a mixed reception by Frankfurt's fire crews in particular, and following a brief trial period, no further orders of the Rapier followed.

One Rapier was delivered to Hong Kong.

References

External links
Dennis Rapier online brochure

Firefighting equipment
Rapier
Rapier